Antiimperialist Action Front-Suxxali Reew Mi was a front of political parties in Senegal. The front was constituted on August 3, 1983. The member parties were LCT, MDP, PAI and PPS.

The president of the front was Mamadou Dia. The front took the programme of a predecessor structure, COSU.

Sources
Nzouankeu, Jacques Mariel. Les partis politiques sénégalais. Dakar: Editions Clairafrique, 1984.

1983 establishments in Senegal
Communist parties in Senegal
Defunct communist parties
Defunct left-wing political party alliances
Defunct political parties in Senegal
Defunct political party alliances in Africa
Political parties established in 1983
Political parties with year of disestablishment missing
Political party alliances in Senegal